Pope Benedict XII (1285 – 25 April 1342), born Jacques Fournier (occitan: Jacme Fournier), was head of the Catholic Church from 30 December 1334 to his death in April 1342. He was the third Avignon pope. Benedict was a careful pope who reformed monastic orders and opposed nepotism. Unable to remove his capital to Rome or Bologna, he started the great palace at Avignon. He decided against a notion of Pope John XXII by saying that souls may attain the "fulness of the beatific vision" before the Last Judgment. Whilst being a stalwart reformer, he attempted unsuccessfully to reunite the Eastern Orthodox and Catholic Churches, almost three centuries after the Great Schism; he also failed to come to an understanding with Emperor Louis IV.

Early life
Little is known of the origins of Jacques Fournier. He is believed to have been born in Canté in the County of Foix around the 1280s to a family of modest means. He became a Cistercian monk and left the countryside to study at the University of Paris. In 1311 he was made Abbot of Fontfroide Abbey and quickly became known for his intelligence and organizational ability. In 1317 he was made Bishop of Pamiers. There he undertook a rigorous hunt for Cathars, such as Guillaume Bélibaste, which won him praise from religious authorities, but alienated the local people.

His efforts against the Cathars of Montaillou in the Ariège were carefully recorded in the Fournier Register, which he took to Rome and deposited in the Vatican Library. His transcription was edited by Jean Duvernoy and has been documented by Emmanuel Le Roy Ladurie's pioneering microhistory, Montaillou, village occitan.

In 1326, upon the successful rooting out of the last – it was believed – Cathars of the south, he was made Bishop of Mirepoix in the Ariège, and, a year later, in 1327, he was made a cardinal.

Accession to papacy
Fournier succeeded John XXII as pope, after being elected in the conclave of 1334. The conclave opened on 13 December, and it appeared that there might be a quick election. A two-thirds majority were prepared to elect Cardinal Jean-Raymond de Comminges, the Bishop of Porto, if he would only swear in advance to agree not to return the papacy to Rome. Comminges refused to make any promises in order to get elected. The conclave therefore ground on through lengthy discussions. As Fournier himself said, "... in the discussion held over the election of a future pope, they could certainly have agreed on others more conspicuous for the repute of their great merits...", in other words, there were a number of possible candidates. The Cistercian cardinal, Jacques Fournier, was elected on the evening of 20 December 1334, after Vespers, on the eighth day of the conclave.

The election of Fournier happened as the result of an accident. According to the Catholic Encyclopedia:

Papal policy and activity

Benedict XII was a reforming pope who did not carry out the policies of his predecessor. He chose to make peace with Holy Roman Emperor Louis IV, and as far as possible came to terms with the Franciscans, who were then at odds with the Roman See. He tried to curb the luxuries of the monastic orders, though without much success. He also ordered the construction of the Palais des Papes in Avignon.

Benedict spent most of his time working on questions of theology. He rejected many of the ideas developed by John XXII. In this regard, he promulgated an apostolic constitution, Benedictus Deus, in 1336. This dogma defined the Church's belief that the souls of the departed go to their eternal reward immediately after death, as opposed to remaining in a state of unconscious existence until the Last Judgment. Though some claim that he campaigned against the Immaculate Conception, this is far from clear. He engaged in long theological debates with other noted figures of the age, such as William of Ockham and Meister Eckhart.

Though born a Frenchman, Benedict felt no patriotism towards France nor its king, Philip VI. From the start of his papacy, relations between him and Philip were frigid. After being informed of Philip's plan to invade Scotland, Benedict hinted that King Edward III of England would most likely win, regardless.

Works

See also

List of popes

References

Bibliography

[1333-1356]
 Guillemain, B. (1952). La politique bénéficiale du Pape Benoît XII. Paris: École des Hautes Études.
 Mahn, J. B. (1950). Le Pape Benoit XII et les Cisterciens. Paris: École des Hautes études.
 Melville, G. (1982). "Source Documents on the Pontificate of Benedict XII," in: Historisches Jahrbuch 102 (1982), pp. 144-182.
 Vidal, Jean-Marie (1905). "Notice sur les oeuvres du Pape Benoit XII." in: Revue d'histoire écclesiastique 6 (1905), pp. 557-565.

Further reading

Murphy, Cullen. God's Jury, - The Inquisition and the Making of the Modern World''. New York: Houghton Mifflin Harcourt 2012.

1285 births
1342 deaths
People from Ariège (department)
13th-century French clergy
14th-century French clergy
Inquisitors
Bishops of Mirepoix
Bishops of Pamiers
Cistercian popes
French popes
Avignon Papacy
Popes
14th-century popes